Tha Phae is a district (amphoe) of Satun province, southern Thailand.

History
The minor district (king amphoe) Tha Phae was established on 1 May 1976 with the two southwestern tambons, Tha Phae and Pae Ra of the district Khuan Kalong. It was upgraded to a full district on 4 July 1994.

Geography
Neighboring districts are (from the northwest clockwise) La-ngu, Khuan Kalong, Khuan Don and Mueang Satun. To the southwest is the Andaman Sea.

Administration
The district is divided into four sub-districts (tambons), which are further subdivided into 28 villages (muban). There are no municipal (thesaban) areas, and four tambon administrative organizations (TAO).

References

External links
amphoe.com

Districts of Satun province